Kathryn Ann "Katie" Macfarlane, (born January 16, 1982) is a former American women's basketball player and a current U.S. Army intelligence officer. She was Army's women's basketball team's all-time leading scorer. Kelsey Minato broke her MacFarlane’s record in December 2015.

High school
Macfarlane attended Clarence High School in Clarence, New York. She graduated in 2000 with 1,426 career points, placing her 50th all-time on the Western New York girls basketball all-time scoring leaders list, according to The Buffalo News. In the 1998–1999 season, she was named an All-Western New York first team selection by The Buffalo News. In the 1999–2000 season, she repeated as an All-Western New York first team selection, and also was named Buffalo News Basketball Player of the Year.

College
Macfarlane attended the United States Military Academy at West Point, New York. During her four-year career with the Black Knights, she set the school's all-time scoring record, which had stood for 20 years. In the 2003–04 season, she was chosen as the Patriot League Player Of The Year, as voted by the league's head coaches.

Army  statistics
Source

Post-college career
Macfarlane was invited to training camp by the Connecticut Sun of the WNBA for the 2004 season. She was signed by the Sun on April 26, 2004. After appearing in one pre-season game, MacFarlane was waived by the Sun on May 12, 2004. MacFarlane then began her career as an Army intelligence officer, where she has served in Iraq for a 15-month tour. She is now married and goes by the name Kathryn Macfarlane Graves. On November 10, 2009 she returned to Clarence High School to be honored as part of the school's Veterans Day events.

References

1982 births
Living people
American women's basketball players
Basketball players from Buffalo, New York
Army Black Knights women's basketball players
People from Clarence, New York
Female United States Army officers
Forwards (basketball)